American Salute is the title of a recording by Chet Atkins with Arthur Fiedler and the Boston Pops Orchestra.

Track listing

Side 1:
 "American Salute" (Morton Gould)
 "Shenandoah" (Traditional)
 "Rodeo: Hoedown" (Aaron Copland)
 *By the Time I Get to Phoenix" (Jimmy Webb)
 "Chester" (from New England Triptych)
 "Tennessee Waltz" (Redd Stewart, Pee Wee King)
 "American Patrol" (F.W. Meacham)

Side 2:
 "Deep in the Heart of Texas" (June Hershey, Don Swander)
 "Galveston" (Jimmy Webb)
 "Down in the Valley" (Traditional)
 "St. Louis Blues March"
 "Dixie" (Traditional)
 "Alabama Jubilee"
 "Pops Roundup"

Personnel
Chet Atkins – guitar

1972 albums
Chet Atkins albums
RCA Records albums